Evy Margareta Berggren (later Westerberg; 16 June 1934 – 5 December 2018) was a Swedish gymnast. She competed at the 1952 and 1956 Summer Olympics and won a gold and a silver medal in team exercise with portable apparatus, respectively; her teams finished fourth all-around in 1952. Her best individual result was a bronze medal on the vault at the 1954 World Artistic Gymnastics Championships.

References

External links 
 

1934 births
2018 deaths
Swedish female artistic gymnasts
Gymnasts at the 1952 Summer Olympics
Gymnasts at the 1956 Summer Olympics
Olympic gymnasts of Sweden
Olympic gold medalists for Sweden
Olympic silver medalists for Sweden
Olympic medalists in gymnastics
Medalists at the 1956 Summer Olympics
Medalists at the 1952 Summer Olympics
Medalists at the World Artistic Gymnastics Championships
People from Skellefteå Municipality
Sportspeople from Västerbotten County
20th-century Swedish women